Muyuga is a village in the Commune of Bururi in Bururi Province in southern Burundi. By road it is located 6.6 kilometres southeast of Bururi.

References

External links
Satellite map at Maplandia.com

Populated places in Bururi Province